The Apple Cart: A Political Extravaganza is a 1928 play by George Bernard Shaw. It is a satirical comedy about several political philosophies which are expounded by the characters, often in lengthy monologues. The plot follows the fictional English King Magnus as he spars with, and ultimately outwits, Prime Minister Proteus and his cabinet, who seek to strip the monarchy of its remaining political influence. Magnus opposes the corporation "Breakages, Limited", which controls politicians and impedes technical progress.

Shaw's preface describes the play as:

The play was completed in December 1928 and first performed in Warsaw (in Polish) the following June. Its English première was at the first Malvern Drama Festival in August 1929.

Shaw based King Magnus largely on himself. He modelled the enigmatic and pivotal character Orinthia, the King's mistress, on Mrs. Patrick Campbell, the actress who had created the role of Eliza Doolittle in Shaw's Pygmalion. The "Powermistress-General" is said by the biographers of Beatrice Webb to be modelled on Susan Lawrence, an old colleague of Shaw from the Fabian Society.

Characters
Sempronius      The King's Private Secretary
Pamphilius      The King's Private Secretary
Billy Boanerges       President of the Board of Trade
King MagnusOrinthia         King's MistressAlice            Princess RoyalJoe Proteus         Prime MinisterPliny            Chancellor of the ExchequerNicobar          Foreign SecretaryCrassus          Colonial SecretaryBalbus           Home SecretaryAmanda Postelthwaite           Postmistress GeneralLysistrata       Powermistress GeneralVanhattan        American AmbassadorQueen Jemima

 Productions 
 There was a Coronation Year Production in 1953.  It went on tour and starred Noël Coward as Magnus and Margaret Leyton as Orinthia.  It was particularly memorable for Coward's performance. He could stand absolutely still and absolutely silent and still keep every eye in the audience on him. 1965 production directed by Peter Dews starring Marius Goring as King Magnus and Barbara Murray as Orinthia staged at the Cambridge Arts Theatre, the Opera House, Manchester, the New Wimbledon Theatre, Theatre Royal, Brighton and the Golders Green Hippodrome.
 1985-1986 production directed by Val May starring Peter O'Toole as King Magnus, Susannah York as Orinthia and Marius Goring as Nicobar at the Theatre Royal, Bath and the Theatre Royal Haymarket.
 2012 production in Slezské divadlo, Opava, the Czech Republic. Translated by Alžběta Matoušková. Directed by Roman Groszman. The play premiered on 11 November 2012 with Michal Stalmach (King Magnus), Drahomír Ožana (Joe Proteus), Pavel Rohan (Billy Boanerges), Kostas Zerdaloglu (Balbus), Martin Táborský (Plinius), Emanuel Křenek (Nicobar), Ivana Lebedová (Lysistrata), Hana Vaňková (Amanda Postelthwaite), Sabina Muchová (Queen Jemima), Šárka Vykydalová or Tereza Starostková (Orinthia), Jakub Stránský (Pamphilius), Daniel Volný (Sempronius), Ludmila Štědrá (Vanhattan), Tereza Diatilová or Anežka Bindrová (Alice).

AdaptationsThe Apple Cart was presented as part of the BBC Television's Play of the Month series in 1975. Nigel Davenport starred as King Magnus and Helen Mirren as Orinthia. It is included in the Helen Mirren at the BBC DVD box set.

A BBC Radio production of The Apple Cart'' was adapted for radio and directed by Ian Cotteril and starred Peter Barkworth as King Magnus, Prunella Scales as Orinthia, Nigel Stock as Proteus, Sonia Fraser as Queen Jemima and Elizabeth Spriggs as Lysistrata and subsequently rebroadcast on BBC Radio 4 Extra.

Notes and references

External links

gutenberg.net.au Full text of the play, including a preface and articles relating to the play.
The Apple Cart on Archive.org

1929 plays
Plays by George Bernard Shaw